David Alarza Palacios (born 7 January 1977) is a Spanish judoka.

Alarza began competing in judo at a very young age, taking part in the Club of Judo Brunete in Brunete, Spain. During this young age, Alarza began to show interest and virtues in martial arts. Its coach knew that he would arrive very far away, thanks to his tactic and fight body to body. David Alarza, along his path, has been rewarded by his merits in judo. He is considered to be one of the best international judokas in his international level. Currently, Alarza coaches in the "Centro de Alto Rendimiento de Madrid".

Alarza is a fan of the mountains of Spain and enjoys mountain biking.

Achievements

External links
 
 

1977 births
Living people
Spanish male judoka
Judoka at the 2004 Summer Olympics
Judoka at the 2008 Summer Olympics
Olympic judoka of Spain
Mediterranean Games bronze medalists for Spain
Mediterranean Games medalists in judo
Competitors at the 2001 Mediterranean Games
20th-century Spanish people
21st-century Spanish people